Nah=Poo – The Art of Bluff is the debut studio album by Pete Wylie under the name Wah!, released in 1981 by record label Eternal.

Track listing
All tracks composed by Pete Wylie; except where indicated

Reception
AllMusic wrote: "Pete Wylie's first album as/with Wah! is his finest work, filled to the brim with passionate post-punk and blitzkrieg funk that holds an impressive level of focused intensity from front to back".

References

External links
 

1981 debut albums
Pete Wylie albums